Usenet, a worldwide distributed Internet discussion system, can be accessed through Web browsers as well as through dedicated news clients.

Introduction
Usenet newsgroups are traditionally accessed by a newsreader. The user must obtain a news server account and a newsgroup reader. With Web-based Usenet, all of the technical aspects of setting up an account and retrieving content are alleviated by allowing access with one account.  The content is made available for viewing via any Web browser.

Setup and access
The browser interface offered by Web-based Usenet providers is typically known as a Usenet browser. All of the content is already compiled and ready for viewing. Normally, they will have a thumbnail format for their images and videos to make browsing much faster and simpler. Typically, there is no setup for Web-based Usenet. It is as easy as navigating through a browser to the provider's Web site. Web-based Usenet is especially useful for those who have access to the internet but do not have, or do not know how to set up, a traditional newsreader.

Web-based popularity
Google Groups was the most popular and by far the largest Web-based Usenet archive (consisting of over 700 million posts dating from as early as 1981) until its advanced search functionality became nonfunctional in February 2015. As of May 2017, Easynews appears to be the only regularly updated and reliable way to access newsgroups through a Web browser.

References

Usenet
Usenet clients
Usenet free posting